Mary Jo White (born December 27, 1941) is an American politician who served as a Republican member of the Pennsylvania State Senate for the 21st District from 1997 to 2013.

Early life and education
White was born in Chicago, Illinois to Joseph and Patricia Ransford.  She graduated from Aquinas High School in 1959 and received a B.A. degree from Quincy University in 1963 and a J.D. from the University of Pittsburgh School of Law in 1967.

Career
She served as a public defender for Venango County, Pennsylvania from 1974 to 1976. From 1977 to 2007 she was the Corporate Secretary and Vice-President for Environmental/Government Affairs for Quaker State Oil Corp.

She was elected to the Pennsylvania Senate for the 21st district and served from 1997 to 2013.  She chaired the Senate Environmental Committee for 12 years and was the first woman elected to the Republican Leadership in 2011. She was considered an expert on issues involving the environment and land use."

She worked as Trustee Emerita for the Board of Trustees for the University of Pittsburgh and as a member of the Pitt Public Health Board of Visitors from 2007 to 2020.

References

External links
Pennsylvania State Senate - Mary Jo White official PA Senate website
Senator White official caucus website

1941 births
20th-century American politicians
21st-century American politicians
Living people
Pennsylvania lawyers
Republican Party Pennsylvania state senators
People from Franklin, Pennsylvania
Politicians from Chicago
Quincy University alumni
University of Pittsburgh School of Law alumni
Women state legislators in Pennsylvania
21st-century American women politicians
20th-century American women politicians
Public defenders